Dulcinea del Toboso is a fictional character who is unseen in Miguel de Cervantes' novel Don Quijote. Don Quijote believes he must have a lady, under the mistaken view that chivalry requires it.
As he does not have one, he invents her, making her the very model of female perfection: "[h]er name is Dulcinea, her country El Toboso, a village of La Mancha, her rank must be at least that of a princess, since she is my queen and lady, and her beauty superhuman, since all the impossible and fanciful attributes of beauty which the poets apply to their ladies are verified in her; for her hairs are gold, her forehead Elysian fields, her eyebrows rainbows, her eyes suns, her cheeks roses, her lips coral, her teeth pearls, her neck alabaster, her bosom marble, her hands ivory, her fairness snow, and what modesty conceals from sight such, I think and imagine, as rational reflection can only extol, not compare" (Part I, Chapter 13, translation of John Ormsby).

Don Quijote is throughout the novel portrayed as both admirable ("and doth she not of a truth accompany and adorn this greatness with a thousand million charms of mind!"  "that, winnowed by her hands, beyond a doubt the bread it made was of the whitest.") and ridiculous. Sancho knows this and is enthusiastic for Dorothea in as much as "if your worship goes looking for dainties in the bottom of the sea".

Dulcinea is based on the Spanish word dulce (sweet), and suggests an overly elegant "sweetness". To this day, a reference to someone as one's "Dulcinea" implies idealistic devotion and love for her.

Spurious Part II of the work
An unidentified writer using the pseudonym Alonso Fernández de Avellaneda in 1614 published a Part II of Don Quijote.

Although support for Avellaneda's view of Dulcinea is found in Part I of Don Quixote, he has little interest in the glorious, imaginary Dulcinea. Scholars commonly say that because of this and many similar misreadings by Avellaneda, which Cervantes found offensive, he was motivated to complete his own unfinished Part II, which was published the following year.  ("...especially my lady the princess Dulcinea, who staggers one's senses."  "...who went skipping and capering like goats over the pleasant fields there...")

Opera
The Jules Massenet opera Don Quichotte depicts Dulcinée as a major character, the local queen who sends the knight on a quest to retrieve her jewels.

In popular culture
 The French composer Maurice Ravel composed Don Quichotte à Dulcinée (1932–33), a cycle of three songs for baritone voice and accompaniment.
"Dulcinea" is the female lead in the TV series The Adventures of Puss in Boots.
Dulcinea is the title of the 1994 album by the American indie band Toad the Wet Sprocket.
Dulcinea is the 2008 album by the band Tremoloco
Dulcinea appears in the Japanese series Zukkoke Knight – Don De La Mancha. Her real name is Fedora (in the English dub). She is daughter of the bandit king, Poormouth. Her role is to help her bankrupt father by stealing, but she fails almost every time. She fools Don Quixote into helping her. She is voiced by Mami Koyama.
"Dulcinea" is the title of the first episode of the Syfy television show, The Expanse.
"Dulcinea" is the name of the third track on the album In the Absence of Truth by Isis.
"Dulcinea" is the name of the second track on the EP The Penance and the Patience by Australian rock band Closure in Moscow.

See also
List of Don Quixote characters

References

Notes

Don Quixote characters
Unseen characters
Fictional Spanish people
Literary characters introduced in 1605
Female characters in literature
Fictional farmers
he:דולסינאה דל טובוסו